William Tulip Reay (August 21, 1918 – September 23, 2004) was a Canadian professional ice hockey player and coach. Reay played ten seasons in the National Hockey League (NHL) from 1953 to 1953, winning two Stanley Cups. He then coached from 1957 to 1959 in the NHL and again from 1963 to 1977, primarily with the Chicago Blackhawks, who he coached to the Stanley Cup Finals three times. While he did not win a Cup as a coach, Reay won over 500 games as a head coach; when he retired, he was second in NHL history in wins, and he currently is one of 28 coaches to have won 500 games.

Career
Born in Winnipeg, Manitoba, he played in the NHL for ten seasons with the Montreal Canadiens and the Detroit Red Wings. In 479 games, he scored 105 goals and 267 points and in 63 playoff games, he scored 13 goals and 29 points. He won the Stanley Cup two times, in 1946 and 1953, both with the Montreal Canadiens. He was the head coach for the Toronto Maple Leafs (1957–1959) and the head coach for the Chicago Black Hawks (1963–1977). He won the most games for a Chicago Black Hawks coach. Although he coached the Black Hawks to three Stanley Cup Finals (1965, 1971, and 1973), he never won the Cup. He is the franchise's all-time leader in wins (516) and years coached (14).

Before beginning a career from which he retired with the second most victories in NHL history, Reay was a Canadiens centre who is believed to be the first player to raise his arms and stick to celebrate a goal when he did so after scoring in a game in 1947.

He died of liver cancer in Madison, Wisconsin.

Career statistics

Regular season and playoffs

Coaching record

Awards and achievements
Turnbull Cup MJHL Championship (1938)
Memorial Cup Championship (1938)
Allan Cup Championship (1944)
Stanley Cup Championships (1946 & 1953)
Played in NHL All-Star Game (1952)
Calder Cup (AHL) Championship (1963)
Selected Manitoba's All-Century Second Team Coach
Honoured Member of the Manitoba Hockey Hall of Fame

References

External links
 

1918 births
2004 deaths
Canadian ice hockey centres
Canadian ice hockey coaches
Deaths from cancer in Wisconsin
Chicago Blackhawks coaches
Deaths from liver cancer
Detroit Red Wings players
Montreal Canadiens players
Omaha Knights (AHA) players
Quebec Aces (QSHL) players
St. Boniface Seals players
Ice hockey people from Winnipeg
Stanley Cup champions
Vancouver Canucks (WHL) players